Ulf Rönner (born 3 October 1946) is a Swedish sprinter. He competed in the men's 4 × 400 metres relay at the 1972 Summer Olympics.

References

1946 births
Living people
Athletes (track and field) at the 1972 Summer Olympics
Swedish male sprinters
Olympic athletes of Sweden
Place of birth missing (living people)
20th-century Swedish people